Guitar Bazaar is the second solo recording by Tim Sparks on the Acoustic Music Records label, released in 1995.

History
After a journey to Hungary, Yugoslavia and Bosnia in the late 1980s, Sparks began an interest in Eastern European music. He began playing in various world music groups and immersed himself in various styles. He has described Guitar Bazaar as a fusion of Middle Eastern and American roots music. The album includes arrangements of Béla Bartók's Romanian Dances. It was this album that John Zorn heard that led to Sparks' recording of his series of albums for Tzadik Records.

Reception 

Guitar Player wrote in their review, "If you're getting complacent about your acoustic fingerpicking, you'd better hear Tim Sparks' new CD... There's nothing forced or studied about his playing or compositions: his intense, on-the-edge attack speaks of many nights wailing around campfires in places most of us have never heard of."

Track listing
All compositions by Tim Sparks.
 "Bach-n-Aliya" – 5:08
 "The Rain Beggar" – 6:21
 "Guitar Bazaar" – 3:17
 "Sleeping Giant" – 9:15
 "Chasing the Dragon" – 4:40
 "Rumanian Folk Dances" – 5:19
 "It's Greek to Me" – 5:28
 "Sailing to Byzantium" – 4:32
 "Dr. Smedvig's Berzerka" – 3:40

Personnel
Tim Sparks - acoustic guitar
Tim O'Keefe - frame drum, harmonica, doumbec
Jim Price - violin
Mark Stillman - accordion
Yanaris Asimakes - bouzouki

Production notes
Produced by Tim Sparks and Jay M. Fleming
Executive producer - Peter Finger
Engineered by Jay Fleming

References

1995 albums
Tim Sparks albums